Eric Butorac and Scott Lipsky were the defending champions, but they chose to compete in Munich instead.
Marc López and David Marrero won in the final 6–7(1–7), 6–4, [10–4], against Pablo Cuevas and Marcel Granollers.

Seeds

Draw

Draw

References
 Main Draw

Estoril Open - Doubles
Portugal Open
Estoril Open - Mens Doubles, 2010